Eudonia mercurella is a species of moth of the family Crambidae. It is found in Europe, western China, Iran, Lebanon, Turkey, and north-western Africa.

The wingspan is 16–19 mm. The forewings are dark black variously mixed with brown and with a darker band along the distal edge of the pale antemedian line. The pale postmedian line is usually distinct against the dark ground colour.

The moth flies from June to August depending on the location. 

The larvae feed on various mosses.

Phalaena mercurella described by Zetterstedt in 1839 was actually Eudonia murana.

References

External links
 waarneming.nl 
 Lepidoptera of Belgium
 Eudonia mercurella at UKmoths
 
 

Eudonia
Moths described in 1758
Moths of Africa
Moths of Asia
Moths of Europe
Taxa named by Carl Linnaeus